A sheriff is a government official, with varying duties, existing in some countries with  historical ties to England where the office originated. There is an analogous, although independently developed, office in Iceland that is commonly translated to English as sherif.

Description
Historically, a sheriff was a legal official with responsibility for a shire, the term being a contraction of 
 "shire reeve"  (Old English ).

In British English, the political or legal office of a sheriff, term of office of a sheriff, or jurisdiction of a sheriff, is called a shrievalty in England and Wales, and a sheriffdom in Scotland.

In modern times, the specific combination of legal, political and ceremonial duties of a sheriff varies greatly from country to country.
 In England, Northern Ireland, or Wales, a sheriff (or high sheriff) is a ceremonial county or city official.
 In Scotland, sheriffs are judges.
 In the Republic of Ireland,  in some counties and in the cities of Dublin and Cork, sheriffs are legal officials similar to bailiffs.
 In the United States, a sheriff is a sworn law enforcement officer whose duties vary across states and counties. A sheriff is generally an elected county official, with duties that typically include policing unincorporated areas, maintaining county jails, providing security to courts in the county, and (in some states) serving warrants and court papers. In addition to these policing and correction services, a sheriff is often responsible for enforcing civil law within the jurisdiction.
 In Canada, sheriffs exist in most provinces. The provincial sheriff services generally manage and transport court prisoners, serve court orders, and in some provinces sheriffs provide security for the court system, protect public officials, support investigations by local police services and in Alberta, sheriffs carry out traffic enforcement.
 In Australia and South Africa sheriffs are legal officials similar to bailiffs. In these countries there is no link maintained between counties and sheriffs.
 In India, a sheriff is a largely ceremonial office in a few major cities.

Great Britain and Ireland

England, Wales and Northern Ireland

The Old English term designated a royal official (a reeve)  responsible for keeping the peace throughout a shire or county on behalf of the king. The term was preserved in England notwithstanding the Norman Conquest.

Today,  sheriff or high sheriff is a ceremonial county or city official. Some commercial organisations use the term to refer to High Court enforcement officers.

Scotland

In Scotland the sheriff is a judicial office holder in the sheriff courts, and they are members of the judiciary of Scotland.

Sheriffs principal
The most senior sheriffs are the sheriffs principal, who have administrative as well as judicial authority in the six sheriffdoms, and are responsible for the effective running and administration of all the sheriff courts in their jurisdiction. Sheriffs principal also sit as appeal sheriffs in the Sheriff Appeal Court; hearing appeals against sentencing and conviction from summary trials in the sheriff courts and justice of the peace courts. The additional duties of a sheriff principal include being Commissioners of the Northern Lighthouse Board (which is the general lighthouse authority for Scotland), and chairing local criminal justice boards which bring together local representatives of procurator fiscal, Police Scotland and Community Justice Scotland, and Scottish Courts and Tribunals Service.

Sheriffs
Sheriffs deal with the majority of civil and criminal court cases in Scotland, with the power to preside in solemn proceedings with a jury of 15 for indictable offences and sitting alone in summary proceedings for summary offences. A sheriff must be legally qualified, and have been qualified as an advocate or solicitor for at least 10 years. The maximum sentencing power of sheriff in summary proceedings is 12 months imprisonment, or a fine of up to £10,000. In solemn proceedings the maximum sentence is 5 years imprisonment, or an unlimited fine.

Sheriffs also preside over fatal accident inquiries which are convened to examine the circumstances around sudden or suspicious deaths, including those who die in the course of employment, in custody, or in secure accommodation.

Summary sheriffs
Summary sheriffs hear civil cases brought under Simple Procedure and criminal cases brought under summary proceedings. Their sentencing powers are identical to a sheriff sitting in summary proceedings.

Republic of Ireland
In the Republic of Ireland, a sheriff is appointed under section 12(3) of the Court Officers Act 1945, to perform some of the functions that would otherwise be performed by the county registrar. In practice, two types of sheriff have been appointed:
 Four sheriffs (one each for Dublin city, County Dublin, Cork city, and County Cork) are full-time public officials whose responsibilities are:
enforcing court orders of the Circuit Court, such as eviction or debt collection
acting as returning officer in public elections
executing tax certificates on behalf of the Revenue Commissioners.
 Twelve sheriffs, colloquially called "Revenue sheriffs", have only the third of the preceding functions, the others being done by the county registrar's office. Revenue sheriffs are solicitors in private practice. Each covers one or more of the state's remaining counties grouped as follows: Carlow and Kildare; Cavan, Leitrim, Longford and Monaghan; Clare and Limerick; Donegal; Galway; Kerry; Kilkenny and Waterford; Laois, Offaly and Tipperary; Louth, Meath and Westmeath; Mayo; Roscommon and Sligo; and Wexford and Wicklow.

Prior to the 1922 creation of the Irish Free State, Irish law regarding sheriffs mirrored that of England, latterly with each administrative county and county borough having a ceremonial High Sheriff and functional under-sheriffs responsible for enforcing court orders of the county court or quarter sessions. The Courts of Justice Act 1924 replaced these courts with a new Circuit Court. The Court Officers Act 1926 formally abolished High Sheriffs and phased out under-sheriffs by providing that, as each retired, his functions would be transferred to the county registrar,  established by the 1926 act as an officer of the Circuit Court. When the Dublin city under-sheriff retired in 1945, the city registrar was too overworked with other responsibilities to take over his duties, so the Court Officers Act 1945 was passed to allow a new office of sheriff to take over some or all of the under-sheriff's functions. The four Dublin and Cork sheriffs were soon appointed, with much of the under-sheriff's responsibilities. Revenue sheriffs were introduced for the rest of the state in the late 1980s as part of a crackdown on tax evasion.  In 1993 the Comptroller and Auditor General expressed concern that funds collected and held in trust by sheriffs on behalf of the Revenue Commissioners were at risk of commingling. This was reformed in 1998 by prohibiting sheriffs from retaining the interest earned on such monies and, to compensate, increasing their retainer. Through to the 1990s the sheriff's post was in the gift of the minister for Justice, but by the 2010s it was advertised by the Public Appointments Service.

Oceania

Australia

A sheriff's office exists in most Australian states and territories, with various duties.

 Before 1824, prisons in the British penal colony of New South Wales were overseen by the Provost Marshal. This title/position was replaced by that of Sheriff when a Charter of Justice was proclaimed in 1824. In addition to detaining accused criminals awaiting trial, the sheriff executed death sentences and other sentences, controlled gaols, and handled prison movements, including the chain gangs that worked on Goat Island and in Sydney.  In 1867, the sheriff began to be replaced by an independent Prisons Department, led by an inspector general, which was later renamed comptroller general. Most Australian states adopted this mode of prison oversight for many years. In New South Wales, the Office of the Sheriff is part of Courts and Tribunal Services. The office has more than 400 employees at 58 sheriffs' offices.  In addition to enforcing writs, warrants, and property seizure orders issued by New South Wales courts and tribunals, the Office of the Sheriff also provides court security and administers the state's jury service.
 In Victoria, the sheriff's office is part of the Victoria Department of Justice and Regulation. The office enforces warrants and orders issued by Victoria courts dealing with unpaid fines (in criminal matters) and unpaid money judgments (in civil matters). The Victoria sheriff's office has various enforcement powers against judgment debtors; they may seize and sell a debtor's assets to satisfy a judgment, place a wheel clamp on a debtor's car, or direct VicRoads to suspend a debtor's driver's license or vehicle registration.
 The Sheriff of Western Australia – also known as the Sheriff of the Supreme Court, Marshal of the Family Court and Marshal of the Federal Court in Western Australia – is an officer of those courts, as well as the District Court and the Magistrates Court. The Sheriff has two main roles.
 "Enforcement services": managing the serving of court documents, including summonses, and the execution of writs, warrants and orders to recover unpaid fines or debts resulting from court judgments; as such, the Sheriff is also responsible for the appointment of bailiffs – who carry out the above services on behalf of the Sheriff.
 "Jury services": preparing jury books, which list people potentially available for jury duty, within 17 jury districts in Western Australia, as well as actually summoning people to act as jurors in the Supreme and District courts. The Sheriff also investigates any failure by jurors to attend court and also has responsibility for the day-to-day management of juries sitting in the Perth metropolitan area.

New Zealand

Sheriffs in New Zealand are officers of the Superior Courts and function as the executive arm of these courts. The role of sheriff is automatically given to anyone who has gained the position of Registrar of the High Court.

North America

Canada
Most provinces and territories in Canada operate a sheriffs service. Sheriffs are primarily concerned with services such as courtroom security, post-arrest prisoner transfer, serving legal processes and executing civil judgements. Sheriffs are defined under section 2 of the Criminal Code as "peace officers". Sheriffs' duties in Ontario deal only with serving legal processes and executing civil judgments. They do not perform court security-related duties, which are handled by the police in which the courthouse is located (municipal and regional police services or the Ontario Provincial Police). In other parts of Canada, where sheriff's services do not exist, the Royal Canadian Mounted Police perform these duties. Quebec has a two-tiered court security system where armed provincial special constables perform court security and the provincial correctional officers perform prisoner escort/transport duties.

Alberta

In 2006, the Province of Alberta expanded the duties of the Alberta Sheriffs Branch (the successor to the former Courts and Prisoner Security agency) to include traffic enforcement, protective security and some investigation functions (Sheriffs Investigative Support Unit and Safer Communities and Neighbourhoods Unit). As of June 2008, the Alberta Sheriffs Branch traffic division includes 105 traffic sheriffs who are assigned to one of seven regions in the province. Sheriffs also assist various police services in Alberta with prisoner management.

British Columbia

Newfoundland and Labrador

The Office of the High Sheriff of Newfoundland and Labrador provides protection and enforcement duties in support of the provincial, supreme, and appeal courts in the province. The sheriffs also assists local law enforcement agencies with additional resources to ensure public safety under the provincial Emergency Preparedness Program.

Nova Scotia
In the Province of Nova Scotia, the sheriffs service focuses on the safety and security of the judiciary, court staff, the public, and persons in custody. There are local sheriffs for every county in Nova Scotia, numbering over 200 in total. They work with up to 20,000 inmates and travel over 2 million kilometers in a year.  Sheriffs are responsible for: court security; the transportation of prisoners to and from institutions and all levels of court; the service of some civil and criminal documents; and the execution of court orders.

Quebec 
In the Province of Quebec, sheriffs (shérifs) are responsible for the jury selection process.

United States

The office of sheriff as county official in colonial North America is recorded from the 1660s.
In the modern United States, the scope of a sheriff varies across states and counties (which in Louisiana are called "parishes" and in Alaska "boroughs"). The sheriff is most often an elected county official who serves as the chief civilian law enforcement officer of their jurisdiction. The sheriff enforces court orders and mandates and may perform duties such as evictions, seizing property and assets pursuant to court orders, and serving warrants and legal papers. In some counties where urban areas have their own police departments, a sheriff may be restricted to civil procedure enforcement duties, while in other counties, the sheriff may serve as the principal police force and have jurisdiction over all of the county's municipalities, including those operating their own police departments. A sheriff often administers the county jails and is responsible for court security functions within their jurisdiction.

India

Among cities in India, only Mumbai (Bombay), Kolkata (Calcutta) and Chennai (Madras), the three former British Presidencies, have had a Sheriff. First established in the 18th century based on the English High Sheriffs, they were the executive arm of the Judiciary, responsible for assembling jurors, bringing people to trial, supervising the gaoling (imprisonment) of prisoners and seizing and selling property. After the mid-19th century the responsibilities and powers of the role were reduced and the positions became ceremonial. The Sheriffs of Mumbai and Kolkata still exist, although the post in Chennai was abolished in 1998.

In present times the sheriff has an apolitical, non-executive role, presides over various city-related functions and conferences and welcomes foreign guests. The post is second to the mayor in the protocol list.

South Africa

In South Africa, the sheriffs are officers of the court and function as the executive arm of the court. They are responsible for serving court processes like summonses and subpoenas. They play an important role in the execution of court orders like the attachments of immovable and movable property; evictions, demolitions etc.

The Sheriffs Act 90 of 1986, which came into operation on 1 March 1990, governs the profession. A sheriff is appointed by the Minister for Justice and Constitutional Development in terms of Section 2 of the Act.

Related offices

Iceland

In Iceland, sýslumenn (singular , translated "sheriff") are administrators of the state, holders of the executive power in their jurisdiction and heads of their Sheriff's Office. Sheriffs are in charge of certain legal matters that typically involve registration of some sort and executing the orders of the court. The duties of the sheriffs differ slightly depending on their jurisdiction but they can be broadly categorised as:

 Duties of all sheriffs: marital matters (such as general registration of marital status and performing civil marriages), statutory matters, inheritance matters and more.

 Duties of all sheriffs except in Reykjavík: collection of public fees, publication of licences and permits for various personal and business purposes and more.

 Special duties of some sheriffs: in some jurisdictions the sheriff is also the commissioner of police.

There are 24 sheriffs and sheriff jurisdictions in Iceland. The jurisdictions are not defined by the administrative divisions of Iceland but are mainly a mixture of counties and municipalities.

The post of sheriff was mandated by the Old Covenant, an agreement between the Icelandic Commonwealth and the Kingdom of Norway. The agreement which was ratified between 1262 and 1264 makes the post of sheriff the oldest secular position of government still operating in Iceland.

See also 
 Police
 Marshal
 Constable
 Sheriff of Nottingham

References

External links

 
Government occupations
Judiciary of Scotland
Law enforcement titles
Legal professions
Titles
Positions of authority